USS Pollack (SSN-603), a Permit-class attack submarine, was the second ship of the United States Navy to be named for the pollack, a food fish resembling the true cod, but with the lower jaw projecting and without the barbel.

The contract to build Pollack was awarded to New York Shipbuilding Corporation in Camden, New Jersey on 3 March 1959 and her keel was laid down on 14 March 1960.  She was launched on 17 March 1962, sponsored by Mrs. John Pastore, and commissioned on 26 May 1964.

Service history
Pollack reported to the Commander in Chief, U.S. Atlantic Fleet for duty, and became a unit of Submarine Squadron 4, homeported in Charleston, South Carolina. After shakedown in the Caribbean Sea, she underwent a six-month evaluation as an anti-submarine warfare (ASW) weapon.

Most of 1965 was spent at sea evaluating new ASW tactics, participating in a destroyer versus submarine evaluation, and practicing an anti-shipping mission.  Also during 1965 Pollack earned the Navy Unit Commendation.

During 1966, Pollack was evaluated in coordinated ASW operations. She spent most of 1967 at sea, making various weapons tests. On 1 March 1968, Pollack'''s homeport was changed to Norfolk, Virginia, and she became a unit of Submarine Squadron 10, the first all-nuclear attack submarine squadron in the Navy. Pollack remained with the Atlantic Fleet into 1970.History from 1970 to 1975 needed.Following refueling overhaul at Charleston Naval Shipyard, Pollack was transferred to the Pacific Fleet and SubRon-3.  She made a liberty call in Roosevelt Roads, Puerto Rico and transited the Panama Canal to reach her new home port of San Diego, California, in March 1975.History from 1975 to 1979 needed.In 1979 Pollack began a refit in Mare Island Naval Shipyard in Vallejo, California. She returned to Submarine Squadron 3, Submarine tender , and San Diego, in 1982.History from 1982 to 1988 needed.In 1988, Pollack transferred to Submarine Group 5 at Mare Island Naval Shipyard.History from 1988 to 1989 needed.Pollack was decommissioned and stricken from the Naval Vessel Register on 1 March 1989 . Ex-Pollack entered the Nuclear Powered Ship and Submarine Recycling Program in Bremerton, Washington, on 9 February 1993. Recycling was completed on 17 February 1995.

 See also 
SUBSAFE Submarine Quality Assurance Program

 References 

 Sontag and Drew, Blind Man's Bluff: The Untold Story of American Submarine Espionage''

External links

 
 USS Pollack website

 

Ships built by New York Shipbuilding Corporation
Permit-class submarines
Cold War submarines of the United States
Nuclear submarines of the United States Navy
1962 ships